Banga, officially the Municipality of Banga (Jawi: ايڠايد نو باڠ), is a 1st class municipality in the province of South Cotabato, Philippines. According to the 2020 census, it has a population of 89,164 people.

Banga is situated at the north-west of the province of South Cotabato. The town derived its name from a palm tree known to the natives of the place as "Buanga" which during the pre-settlement time, predominantly grew in the area.

Banga is linked by a concrete national highway road from General Santos to the east and Cotabato City in the west. The town is known for its spacious town plaza, its public market is situated in the heart of the town and ideally zonified. Water for households and commercial use is abundant and the best source to it is Banga River which narrowly dissects the municipality.

It is the leading corn producer in the province and has made extraordinary achievements in terms of producing corn husk products for the local market.

It is also blessed with rich resources such as livestock and rice and has shown potential for mango. Pineapple and banana production while endowed with big rice mills, metal craft potentials, places suited for inland fishing and some residential development.

Banga works under the slogan “Cooperative Efforts towards Peace and Progress” and it is targeting to rapidly lift its economy to the highest level.

Banga strives to sustaining self-sufficiency and increasing agricultural production. It currently aims for the diversification and intensification of traditional agricultural practices, advocacy of food sufficiency method such as vegetable and fruit planting, poultry and livestock development within family farms, intensification on agricultural nurseries for a high yielding variety of crops, strengthening of information dissemination of appropriate technology to all farmers in the Barangay's by providing effective seminars, workshop and training in proper management of farmer's cooperative.

History
It started as a Settlement District of the Allah Valley Project of the National Land Settlement Administration (NLSA) on March 4, 1941, with Gen. Paulino Santos as the General Manager. On September 11, 1953, by way of Presidential Proclamation No. 612 of the then President Elpidio Quirino, it was emancipated as a barrio of Koronadal and became an independent municipal entity.

Geography

Barangays
Banga is politically subdivided into 22 barangays.

Climate

Demographics

Economy

Agriculture is the major economy of Banga. Corn, livestock, rice mango production potential, pine- apple, bananas, big rice mills, metal craft, inland fishing residential development. .

Festivals
Pasundayag Festival – 1st Week of March

Pasundayag, an Ilonggo term which means “show” or “presentation” is a unique fiesta celebration which showcases the municipality's local talents in a week-long celebration of good life and thanksgiving of the people of Banga.

Banga, the corn production center of South Cotabato, celebrates its foundation every 1st Week of March with a colorful Pasundayag festival a showcase of merry-making activities with its week-long events of beer and food festivals, street dancing competition, beauty pageant, trade fare, bargain shops and street parties.

Tourism
Mila's Peak is the highest part of the Roxas Mt. Range in the east which elevates viewers to a ground where they can see the vast plains towards Mt. Matutum in the east and the entire Allah Valley areas in the north-west.
Sitio Lamkot is located at Barangay Malaya. The uniqueness of the said sitio is one the spot where the agricultural plain surrounded by a mountain, open a panorama of a typical village that could sustain its economic needs independently in the midst of Plenty and Beauty.

Education
Secondary:

Elementary:

Notable personalities

 Orlando Quevedo -  Filipino prelate of the Catholic Church. A Cardinal since 2014, he was Archbishop of Cotabato from 1998 to 2018. He became a bishop in 1980.
 Delfin Lorenzana - 36th Secretary of National Defense of the Philippines.

References

External links

 Banga Profile at PhilAtlas.com
   Banga Profile at the DTI Cities and Municipalities Competitive Index
 [ Philippine Standard Geographic Code]
Philippine Census Information

Municipalities of South Cotabato